Mononcue is an unincorporated community in Wyandot County, in the U.S. state of Ohio.

References

Unincorporated communities in Wyandot County, Ohio
Unincorporated communities in Ohio